Indore Police is the law enforcement agency for Indore, which is under the jurisdiction and command of Madhya Pradesh Police. MP Police (District Indore) serves a region of three million people.

A police commissioner system has been implemented from December 2021 with IG as commissioner.

List of Superintendents of Police

List of Senior Superintendents of Police

List of Deputy Inspector Generals of Police

List of Commissioners of Police

History

Early Years (1870-1910)
Indore city was divided into sub-divisions for police control. Each division was headed by a daroga, and all the darogas used to follow the instructions of the city faujdaar. The men that held post at various police stations were in fact soldiers, usually privates (Persian: sepoys, commonly referred to as jawans). In 1872, a renovation project prepared by Sir T. Madhava Rao handed over the services of all sepoys, cavalry, and senior officials from the military to the judicial cabinet. That administration reform created a clear demarcation between the police and the military.

In 1886, the population of Indore city was about 75,400, which included 864 sepoys (a ratio of 1 jawan per 87 people). Col. Thakur, the first Inspector General of the Indore police, directed his officers to refer to the rules and regulations as framed by the British rulers of India. However, this system was abolished on October 6, 1896, and around 500 jawans were shifted to the police department.

The total annual expense of the state at that time was ₹52,250. This was due to the death of most of the police jawans in the 1903 epidemic and the general public not being ready to be recruited. In 1907, the police administration was once again divided to improve the control of the city, and all of the police chowkis got connected by telephone lines.

References

Law enforcement agencies of India